Brent Sexton (born July 23, 1953) is a former American football player who played for three seasons for the Pittsburgh Steelers. He earned a Super Bowl ring in Super Bowl X over the Dallas Cowboys. He played College Football at Elon College, and was drafted by the Pittsburgh Steelers in the 5th round of the 1975 NFL draft with the 130th pick.

References

1952 births
Living people
American football defensive backs
Elon Phoenix football players
Pittsburgh Steelers players
Players of American football from North Carolina
Sportspeople from Fayetteville, North Carolina